is a Japanese manga artist. He is most famous for the horror manga he drew in the 1980s and 1990s.

Life 

Ochazukenori was born in Kawasaki in 1960. He began reading manga from rental bookstores as a child, later he read Weekly Shōnen Sunday and Weekly Shōnen Magazine and drew manga inspired by 's Submarine 707. In his youth and while attending Rissho University in Tokyo, he drew doujinshi together with friends. When he wanted to start his career as a professional manga artist, he had to send money to his parents to convince them of his career decision, as they wanted them to take over their hardware store. His doujinshi anthology Pen Touch gained a following for its obscure content. In parallel, he worked as an assistant first for manga aritst Nasubi Fujitaka and then . He started his career as a professional artist in 1984 in the lolicon magazine Lemon People with the short story "Seireijima". His pseudonym Ochazukenori is the name of a rice dish with green tea and dried algae. He chose it, because it is similar to his birth name and because another manga artist suggested it to him and he like it.

His first published works outside of lolicon magazines were with the publisher Asahi Sonorama, starting with the short story "Tōkyō ni Yukinofurubi" in 1986. While these manga were science fiction, he received more positive response from readers for his horror manga that he drew for the magazine Monthly Halloween, beginning with the short story "Blind". With the series Zangekikan ("The Horror Mansion"), which he serialized from 1987 until 1993, he shifted fully towards horror manga. At the peak of his career, he drew over 100 pages a month for various monthly magazines.

When the serial murderer Tsutomu Miyazaki sparked a public discourse around horror manga in the early 1990s, Ochazukenori received phone calls at home about how his manga would promote criminal activity.

He also became active as a film director, adapting three of the stories from his Zangekikan series into live-action films in 2008. One of the three episodes, Bathroom, won a film prize at an arthouse film festival.

He published only little new work in the 2000s, but beame more active again in the 2010s. He focused on drawing web manga.

Style 
He is known for an aesthetic of splatter and gore. The center of his stories is often mental illness, with depictions of bloody corpses, fratricide and torture. His character design is angular. Ochazukenori keeps drawing by hand; he says "If you draw with a pen tablet, the manuscript will not remain. So if there is a power outage, you won't be able to read it".

Legacy 
Manga artist Yoshiki Takaya calls Ochazukenori an early influence, as Takaya was contributing to his doujinshi anthology Pen Touch. He recalled: "The kind of stories that Nori was drawing weren't what you'd call 'popular.' Our fanzine was the only place where he could create his own ideal manga."

Ochazukenori has gained some international recognition for his manga. His work has been translated into French. The Japan Foundation in Sydney exhibited his work as part of the exhibition Retro Horror: Supernatural and the Occult in Postwar Japanese Manga from 2019 until 2021.

Works

References

External links 
 Official website (in Japanese)

1960 births
Manga artists from Kanagawa Prefecture
Living people
Japanese horror writers